Rudolf Werlich (born October 4, 1910, date of death unknown) was a German bobsledder who competed in the mid-1930s. At the 1936 Winter Olympics in Garmisch-Partenkirchen, he was listed in the four-man event, but did not compete.

References
1936 bobsleigh four-man results
1936 Olympic Winter Games official report. - p. 416.
Rudolf Werlich's profile at Sports Reference.com

1910 births
Year of death missing
Bobsledders at the 1936 Winter Olympics
German male bobsledders
Olympic bobsledders of Germany